The 2008–09 UCF Knights men's basketball team was an NCAA Division I college basketball team that represented the University of Central Florida and competed in Conference USA. They played their home games at the UCF Arena in Orlando, Florida, and were led by head coach Kirk Speraw who was in his 16th season with the team. In the previous year, the Knights finished the season 16–15, 9–7 in C-USA play.

In February 2012, UCF vacated its wins from the 2008–09 season after it was discovered that there was an ineligible player on the team. The team's pre-sanction record was 17–14 (7–9). The "official" record stands as 0–14.

Roster

Coaches

Schedule and results

|-
!colspan=8 style=| Exhibition

|-
!colspan=8 style=| Regular season (Non-conference play)
|-

|-
!colspan=8 style=| Regular season (Conference play)
|-

|-
!colspan=12 style=| Conference USA tournament
|-

|-
| colspan="8" | *Non-Conference Game. Rankings from AP poll. All times are in Eastern Time.
|}

References

UCF Knights men's basketball seasons
UCF
UCF Knights
UCF Knights